WVOA-LD, virtual and VHF digital channel 6, is a low-power television station serving Syracuse, New York, United States, that is licensed to Westvale. The station is owned by Metro TV, Inc., one of the numerous holding companies owned or co-owned by Craig Fox. WVOA-LD's transmitter is located on the WOLF radio tower on West Kirkpatrick Street northwest of downtown Syracuse.

Until July 13, 2021, the station operated a brokered religious format known as "Love Radio"; "Love Radio" had previously aired in the Syracuse area on 103.9 FM, now known as WSEN. The then-WVOA-LP operated on analog channel 6, allowing its audio feed to be heard on the FM radio dial at 87.7 MHz. To meet the legal requirements for visual content, the station ran the display from a Atari Video Music machine that the station's audio signal was fed into.

Prior to adopting that format in October 2013, the then-WMBO-LP carried a feed of NASA TV, which it had carried since returning to the air in November 2010.

WVOA-LP's programming consisted mostly of brokered religious programming from around the United States, with Salem Radio Network's "The Fish" network filling in unsold gaps. A few secular music programs also aired, primarily on weekends.

Despite a similarity in call signs, there was no relation between WVOA-LP and the Voice of America service. The VOA call sign was requested when the station changed to a classical music format in the late 1980s. The WVOA call sign was retained when the station was returned to Christian Broadcasting about two years later.

As part of the FCC's mandated shutdown on low-power analog television stations, the station ended all analog transmissions on July 13, 2021 at 5 p.m. All programs were moved to sister station WSIV. The station was licensed to begin digital operations effective January 11, 2022, changing its call sign to WVOA-LD.

References

External links

VOA-LD
Craig Fox stations
Television channels and stations established in 1997
1997 establishments in New York (state)
Low-power television stations in the United States